Roger Chudeau (born 28 September 1949) is a French teacher and politician currently affiliated to the National Rally (RN).

A former director at the Ministry of Education and an education advisor to François Fillon's cabinet, he became a Member of the National Assembly for Loir-et-Cher's 2nd constituency in 2022 for the RN.

Biography

Career
Chudeau was born in 1949. He holds a degree in German and worked as a high school teacher before becoming a school inspector with the  Inspector General of National Education (IEN). In 2008, he was appointed Director of Supervision of the Ministry of National Education and the Ministry of Higher Education and Research.

Politics
Chudeau became a member of the Rally for the Republic in 1988 and its successor parties including The Republicans. He was close to François Fillon during his time as Prime Minister and in the Cabinet of François Fillon he became Fillon's advisor on education. Following the defeat of Fillon during the 2017 French presidential election, he briefly retired from politics before joining the National Rally in 2021.

Ahead of the 2022 French legislative election, he contested the seat of Loir-et-Cher's 2nd constituency which was held by former Republicans politician Guillaume Peltier who had defected to Reconquête. Chudeau was successful at winning the seat in the second round.

References

1949 births
Living people
National Rally (France) politicians
Union for a Popular Movement politicians
21st-century French politicians
Deputies of the 16th National Assembly of the French Fifth Republic
French educators